Elsa Burckhardt-Blum (27 November 1900 in Zurich – 7 April 1974 in Küsnacht) was a Swiss architect and painter.

She studied with Wilhelm Hummel. From 1920 to 1923, she studied art history at the Zurich Art School, the ZhdK. From 1930, she interned in architectural offices, and after 1932 started working as an architect.
She built from 1933 to 1951 several buildings in Küsnacht, Zollikon and Zurich, partly with her husband. The bath building in Obere Letten in Zurich was built in 1952. In 1957, she was awarded by the city of Zurich, with her husband, for their excellent buildings.  From 1948 onward,  she took to with pencil and color pencil, and after 1952 with oil paintings. Blum produced abstract pictures, with a preference for geometric shapes, in particular the square, condensed by layering vivid colors or vibrating hatching.
Burckhardt-Blum is the daughter of Emil Blum, a lawyer and the sister of Robert Blum.

References

Artists from Zürich
Swiss women architects
1900 births
1974 deaths
Swiss women painters
20th-century Swiss painters
20th-century Swiss architects
20th-century Swiss women artists